Lecithocera binotata is a moth in the family Lecithoceridae. It was described by Edward Meyrick in 1918. It is found in South Africa.

The wingspan is about 11 mm. The forewings are fuscous sprinkled with dark fuscous. The discal stigmata are rather large and blackish. The hindwings are grey.

References

Endemic moths of South Africa
Moths described in 1918
binotata